KFNW-FM (97.9 FM) is a contemporary Christian music formatted radio station located in Fargo, North Dakota. Branded Life 97.9, the station is owned and operated by Northwestern Media, a ministry of the University of Northwestern- St. Paul in St. Paul, Minnesota.

KFNW is a non-profit radio station, receiving its funding from listener donations and the University of Northwestern- St. Paul. The station is also aired on several low-powered broadcast translators outside of its main listening area. The station's programming is also streamed on the Internet.

Its studios are located on 52nd Avenue South in Fargo, while its transmitter is located near Amenia.

History
On June 1, 2007, a fire in the antenna system used by KFNW-FM, WDAY-FM, and KRWK put all three stations off the air. KFNW-FM later resumed broadcasting from a backup transmitter site at reduced power.

In May 2020, KFNW-FM won the award for Small Market Station of the Year given by the Christian Music Broadcasters.

In May 2021, KFNW-FM moved their studios and offices to a remodeled facility located on 53rd Avenue South in Fargo.

Translators

External links

Contemporary Christian radio stations in the United States
FNW-FM
Cass County, North Dakota
Radio stations established in 1965
1965 establishments in North Dakota
Northwestern Media
FNW-FM